Ndyuka , also called Aukan, Okanisi, Ndyuka tongo, Aukaans, Businenge Tongo (considered by some to be pejorative), Eastern Maroon Creole, or Nenge is a creole language of Suriname and French Guiana, spoken by the Ndyuka people. The speakers are one of six Maroon peoples (formerly called "Bush Negroes") in the Republic of Suriname and one of the Maroon peoples in French Guiana. Most of the 25 to 30 thousand speakers live in the interior of the country, which is a part of the country covered with tropical rainforests. Ethnologue lists two related languages under the name Ndyuka, the other being a dialect of Lutos.

Phonology 
Ndyuka is based on English vocabulary, with influence from African languages in its grammar and sounds. For example, the difference between na ("is") and ná ("isn't") is tone; words can start with consonants such as mb and ng, and some speakers use the consonants kp and gb. (For other Ndyuka speakers, these are pronounced kw and gw, respectively. For example, the word "to leave" is gwé or gbé, from English "go away".) A distinguishing characteristic of the language is the elimination of the letter r which is frequently used in Sranan Tongo.

There are also influences from other languages. According to Creolization and Contact (2002), 46% of the words were from English, 16% from Dutch, 35% from Portuguese, and 3% from African languages.

Orthography 
Modern orthography differs from an older Dutch-based orthography in substituting u for oe and y for j. The digraphs ty and dy are pronounced somewhat like the English ch and j, respectively. Tone is infrequently written, but it is required for words such as ná ("isn't"). The syllabic Afaka script was devised for Ndyuka in 1908.

Latin alphabet 
 A - [a]
 B - [b]
 D - [d]
 E - [e]
 F - [f]
 G - [g]
 H - [h]
 I - [i]
 K - [k]
 L - [l]
 M - [m]
 N - [n]
 O - [o]
 P - [p]
 S - [s]
 T - [t]
 U - [u]
 W - [w]
 Y - [y]
 Z - [z]

Other letters 
 dy - [d͡ʒ]
 ny - [ɲ]
 sy - [ʃ]
 ty - [t͡ʃ]

Long vowels are written with double vowels (e.g. aa [aː], ee [eː])

An acute accent is sometimes used for a high tone. (e.g. á)

Dialects 
The Ndyuka language has three dialects: proper Ndyuka (or Okanisi), Aluku, and Paramaccan, which are ethnically distinct.. 

Kwinti is distinct enough linguistically to be considered a separate language, but it is sometimes included as well under the name Ndyuka.

Ndyuka was also a basis of the Ndyuka-Tiriyó Pidgin.

Example 

Here is an example of Ndyuka text, and its translation into English (showing the similitarities as well as the lexical evolution), adapted from Languages of the Guianas (SIL Publications):

The language bears some similarity to Twi and other Akan languages spoken by the Akan people of Ghana.

Encoding
The IETF language tags have registered:
  as "Eastern Maroon Creole", "Businenge Tongo", "Nenge"
 for the Aluku language
 for the Ndyuka language
 for the Paramaccan language
 for the Kwinti language

See also
 Maroon (people)
 Afaka script

Notes

References

Further reading

External links
Aukan–English Language Learning Library

 
Creoles of the Americas
English language in the Americas